Ivan Surita (5 September 1915 – 18 March 1968) was an Indian cricketer. He played three first-class matches for Bengal between 1935 and 1939.

See also
 List of Bengal cricketers

References

External links
 

1915 births
1968 deaths
Indian cricketers
Bengal cricketers
Cricketers from Kolkata